Eusebio Haliti (born 1 January 1991) is an Albanian and Italian of Albanian descent male retired sprinter and hurdler, who participated at the 2013 World Championships in Athletics.

Achievements

See also
 List of Albanian records in athletics

References

External links
 

1991 births
Living people
Italian male sprinters
Italian male hurdlers
World Athletics Championships athletes for Italy
Athletics competitors of Gruppo Sportivo Esercito
Naturalised citizens of Italy
Italian people of Albanian descent
European Games competitors for Italy
Athletes (track and field) at the 2019 European Games